Ranohira is a town and commune in Madagascar. It belongs to the district of Ihosy, which is a part of Ihorombe Region. The population of the commune was 16,041 in 2018

Primary and junior level secondary education are available in town. It is also a site of industrial-scale  mining. The majority 85% of the population of the commune are farmers, while an additional 10% receives their livelihood from raising livestock. The most important crop is rice, while other important products are peanuts and cassava. Services provide employment for 5% of the population. There is a small supermarket in the town and a hotel typically used by tourists visiting Isalo National Park.

Geography 
Ranohira is situated on the route nationale No. 7 from Tuléar to Fianarantsoa in the South-West of Madagascar.
The next cities are Ilakaka at 26 km  and Ihosy 93 km distance.

It is the closest town to the Isalo National Park.

References and notes 

Populated places in Ihorombe